MyRocks is open-source software developed at Facebook in order to use MySQL features with RocksDB implementations.  It is based on Oracle MySQL 5.6.

Starting from version 10.2.5, MariaDB includes MyRocks as an alpha-stage storage engine.
 MariaDB 10.3.7 includes MyRocks as a storage engine. MyRocks is also shipped with Percona Server.

The library is maintained by the Facebook Database Engineering Team.

Features 
RocksDB is optimized for fast, low-latency storage, and MyRocks is aimed at keeping the storage savings efficient.

MyRock's efficiency focuses on better space efficiency, better write efficiency, and better read efficiency.
 Better space efficiency means using less SSD storage.
 Better write efficiency means SSD endurance.
 Better read efficiency comes from more available IO capacity for handling queries.

Benchmarks 
Benchmark tests against 3 different instances – MyRocks (compressed), InnoDB (uncompressed), and InnoDB (compressed, 8 KB page size) – found:
 MyRocks was 2x smaller than InnoDB (compressed) and 3.5x smaller than InnoDB (uncompressed).
 MyRocks also has a 10x lower storage write rate compared to InnoDB.

With SSD database storage, this means less space used and a higher endurance of the storage over time.

Support platforms 
The officially supported subset of platforms are:
 CentOS 6.8
 CentOS 7.2.x
Compiler toolsets we verify our builds with:
 gcc 4.8.1
 gcc 4.9.0
 gcc 5.4.0
 gcc 6.1.0
 Clang 3.9.0
Best effort is made to support the following OSs:
 Ubuntu 14.04.4 LTS
 Ubuntu 15.10
 Ubuntu 16.04 LTS

See also 
 RocksDB
 Comparison of MySQL database engines

References

External links 
 Official website
 Source Code repository
 MyRocks users mailing list
 Documentation wiki
 MyRocks in MariaDB documentation

MySQL
Bigtable implementations
Database engines
Facebook software
Free software